Sceloporus siniferus, the longtail spiny lizard, is a species of lizard in the family Phrynosomatidae. It is endemic to Mexico.

References

Sceloporus
Endemic reptiles of Mexico
Reptiles described in 1870
Taxa named by Edward Drinker Cope